Island Park Drive is an important and scenic north-south thoroughfare in Ottawa, Ontario, Canada with a length of about 4 km. It is one of several parkways in Ottawa administered by the National Capital Commission providing scenic routes throughout Canada's capital region. 

Many luxury homes and several embassies line the street. The north end connects to the Sir John A. Macdonald Parkway and the Champlain Bridge, which crosses the Ottawa River into Gatineau, Quebec. Island Park Drive is named for Bate Island, the largest island crossed by the Champlain Bridge, which has a small park with road access. The south end connects to the Central Experimental Farm, where it becomes the NCC Driveway.

Island Park Drive has a northbound offramp from the westbound Queensway and no other ramps. Hampton Park is north of the Queensway and borders Island Park Drive. Island Park residents often walk their dogs in the park.

During the summer of 2007, the Highway 417 overpass was replaced using a rapid replacement technology technique which uses heavy lift and rolling equipment. This process lifted out the old bridges and replaced them with new bridges built nearby. The full operation, which required about 15 hours, occurred during the night of 11-12 August 2007, and it is the first time that this method was used in Canada, although it previously was used in other countries including the United States. It was the first of two similar operations in the 417 corridors, the other being at a future date near the Carling Avenue area.  

Commercial vehicles are prohibited from Island Park Drive, which is a two-lane arterial road with a 40 km/h (25 mph) speed limit due to the residential nature.

External links

Roads in Ottawa
National Capital Commission